Hindaun City Bus Depot is a Rajasthan Roadways Bus Depot in Hindaun, Rajasthan, India. It is the central bus stand for the Rajasthan State Road Transport Corporation. Buses are available for Jaipur, Kaila Devi, Gangapur City, Dausa, Sawai Madhopur, Ajmer, Udaipur, Etawah, Bharatpur, Dholpur, Alwar, Tonk, Churu, Jhunjhunu,
Bikaner, Delhi, Haryana, Punjab, Uttarakhand, Gujarat, Uttar Pradesh, Madhya Pradesh and various other locations.

See also 
 Hindaun City
 Hindaun Block
 Hindaun City railway station 
Jagar Dam
Jalsen Reservoir
Nakkash Ki Devi - Gomti Dham
Kaila Devi Temple
Shri Mahavirji
Narsinghji Temple
Karauli District
Educational institutions in Hindaun Subdivision

References

Bus stations in Rajasthan
Hindaun